Naqareh Khaneh (also Romanized as Naqāreh Khāneh; also known as Naqār Khāneh) is a village in Bakharz Rural District, in the Central District of Bakharz County, Razavi Khorasan Province, Iran. At the 2006 census, its population was 231, in 46 families.

References 

Populated places in Bakharz County